Chammeh (also Romanized as Chameh; also known as Chamba) is a village in Soltaniyeh Rural District, Soltaniyeh District, Abhar County, Zanjan Province, Iran. At the 2006 census, its population was 24, in 11 families.

References 

Populated places in Abhar County